Vallehermoso is a village and municipality in the western part of the island La Gomera in the province of Santa Cruz de Tenerife of the Canary Islands, Spain. The town of Vallehermoso, the seat of the municipality, is situated in the northern part of the municipality, 3 km from the coast and 18 km northwest of the island capital, San Sebastián de la Gomera.

Vallehermoso is known for its "miel de palma" (palm honey) as well as tomato, potato and banana production.

Subdivisions
Alojera
Arguamul
El Cercado
Chipude
La Dama
Epina
El Ingenio
Macayo
Tamargada
Tazo

Historical population

Sites of interest 
The municipality features a rock-formed mountain Los Organos which are made up of basalt rocks.  Mountaintops includes El Cercado and La Fortaleza or Chipude.  The natural environment of the mountain area forms a part of the Garajonay Park.  Directly by the coast of Vallehermoso features a cultural centre named El Castillo del Mar, located in an old banana factory which was used until  1950 is the centre for concerts, cinema and folklore music.  The Castillo was restored in 1981 by the photographer Thomas K. Müller.

A botanical garden, Jardín Botánico del Descubrimiento de Vallehermoso, was constructed in 2000 under the direction of the Botanical Gardens in Las Palmas at a cost of 310 million pesetas. Plants from all the Canary Islands archipelago are included, with a special focus on the endemic plants of La Gomera.

See also 

 List of municipalities in Santa Cruz de Tenerife

References 

Municipalities in La Gomera